Hypsibarbus wetmorei, the golden belly barb, lemon fin barb,lemon barb or Kerai (often spelled as Krai) is a species of cyprinid fish. It is native to the Mae Klong, Mekong, Chao Phraya, Tapi and Pahang rivers in Mainland Southeast Asia. Although locally common and considered to be a species of Least Concern, it is threatened (at least in parts of its range) by overfishing, dams and pollution.

It is very popular as a fish for consumption including an ornamental fish, especially in shorter-than-normal shapes called "balloon" or "Pla san" (lit: shorted fish or dwarf fish). This species in Thailand was vernacular named Pla Tapak (ปลาตะพาก), Pla Tapak Lueng (ปลาตะพากเหลือง), Pla Tapak Thong (ปลาตะพากทอง)  or Pla Krapak (ปลากระพาก) according to the poem of King Rama V "Journey to Sai Yok" (ประพาสไทรโยค) etc.

Artificial insemination was first performed by the Kamphaengpet Inland Fisheries Research and Development Center since 2010 and collected the harvested returns to natural water sources for conservation.

References 

Fish of Thailand
Wetmorei
Fish described in 1931